The Estonia national under-17 football team represents Estonia in association football at the under-17 youth level, and is controlled by the Estonian Football Association.

Current squad
 The following players were called up for the 2023 UEFA European Under-17 Championship qualification matches.
 Match dates: 26 October – 1 November 2022
 Opposition: ,  and Caps and goals correct as of: 26 September 2022, after the match against 

Honours and achievements
Under-17 Baltic CupWinners (3):''' 2009, 2014, 2017

See also
 Estonia men's national football team
 Estonia men's national under-21 football team
 Estonia men's national under-19 football team
 Estonia men's national youth football team
 Estonia women's national football team
 Estonia women's national under-17 football team

References

External links
 Home page
 Estonian U-17 team at UEFA Official page

European national under-17 association football teams
under-17